Indian Accounting Standard (abbreviated as Ind-AS) is the Accounting standard adopted by companies in India and issued under the supervision of Accounting Standards Board (ASB) which was constituted as a body in the year 1977. ASB is a committee under Institute of Chartered Accountants of India (ICAI) which consists of representatives from government department, academicians, other professional bodies viz. ICAI, representatives from ASSOCHAM, CII, FICCI, etc. ICAI is an independent body formed under an act of parliament.

The Ind AS are named and numbered in the same way as the International Financial Reporting Standards (IFRS). National Financial Reporting Authority (NFRA) recommend these standards to the Ministry of Corporate Affairs (MCA). MCA has to spell out the accounting standards applicable for companies in India. As on date MCA has notified 40 Ind AS (Ind AS 11 is omitted by companies). 

S. This shall be applied to the companies of financial year 2015-16 voluntarily and from 2016-17 on a mandatory basis.

Based on the international consensus, the regulators will separately notify the date of implementation of Ind-AS for the banks, insurance companies etc. Standards for the computation of Tax has been notified as ICDS in February 2015.

History
India followed accounting standards from Indian Generally Acceptable Accounting Principle (IGAAP) prior to adoption of the Ind-AS.

Applicability
Companies shall follow Ind AS either Voluntarily or Mandatorily. Once a company follows Indian AS, either mandatorily or voluntarily, it can't revert to old method of Accounting.

Mandatory Applicability (1 April 16)
 Every Company with Net worth of not less than 500 crores (5 billion).

Mandatory Applicability from Accounting Period beginning on or after 1 April 2018 
 Every Listed Company.
 Unlisted Companies with Net worth greater than or equal to Rs. 250crore but less than Rs. 500crore(for any of the below mentioned periods).

Net worth shall be checked for the previous four Financial Years (2013–14, 2014–15, 2015–16, and 2016–17)

List of Indian Accounting Standards

Provisions
Ind-AS is in line with the International Financial Reporting Standards (IFRS).

Ind-AS 107 deals with disclosures related to financial instruments and related risks and the policies for managing such risks.

See also
 Nepal Financial Reporting Standards

References

Accounting standards
Accounting in India
Accounting principles by country
Acc

8. http://www.mca.gov.in/MinistryV2/accountingstandards1.html